Laodelphax is a genus of true bugs belonging to the family Delphacidae.

The species of this genus are found in Eurasia.

Species:
 Laodelphax striatellus (Fallén, 1826) 
 Laodelphax truncat  Surya & Singh, 1980

References

Delphacidae